William Hogan (1871 – after 1896) was an English professional footballer who played as a winger. When Hogan signed for Leicester he was "recognised as one of the best baseball players in England" and was wanted by Preston North End.

Professional baseball
Hogan was a professional pitcher for Preston North End Baseball Club in the 1890 National League of Baseball of Great Britain.

References

1871 births
Sportspeople from Aldershot
English footballers
Association football wingers
Church Town F.C. players
Fleetwood Rangers F.C. players
Leicester City F.C. players
Grimsby Town F.C. players
Nelson F.C. players
English Football League players
Year of death missing
Footballers from Hampshire
English baseball players
Church F.C. players